Piskivka is an urban-type settlement in Bucha Raion (district) of Kyiv Oblast (province) in northern Ukraine. It hosts the administration of Piskivka settlement hromada, one of the hromadas of Ukraine. Its population is 6,178 as of the 2001 Ukrainian Census.  The population of the settlement was 7,173 at the 2001 Ukrainian census. Current population: .

Until 18 July 2020, Piskivka belonged to Borodianka Raion. The raion was abolished that day as part of the administrative reform of Ukraine, which reduced the number of raions of Kyiv Oblast to seven. The area of Borodianka Raion was merged into Bucha Raion.

People from Piskivka 
 Maryna Lazebna (born 1975), Ukrainian politician

References

Urban-type settlements in Bucha Raion